Neocalyptrella is a genus of diatoms belonging to the family Rhizosoleniaceae.

Species:
 Neocalyptrella robusta (G.Norman ex Ralfs) Hernández-Becerril & Castillo

References

Diatoms
Diatom genera